Udhayveer Sidhu is an Indian sport shooter who competes in the 25 meter rapid fire pistol, 25 meter pistol, 25 meter standard pistol and 10 meter air pistol. He won a twenty plus international medals representing India. He is in the Indian Shooting Team since 2018. In 2018 ISSF Junior World Cup he won the 25m pistol bronze at the Junior World Cup in Suhl, Germany, and the twins, along with Raj Kanwar Singh, claimed the Indian team's historic gold medal in the event with a world record score of 1747. He won two golds in 2018 ISSF World Shooting Championships.
In 2019 he won two golds and a bronze in 2019 ISSF Junior World Cup and later at 2019 Asian Shooting Championships in 25 meter standard pistol he won a gold and a silver. In 2021 at 2021 ISSF Junior World Championships he won an individual gold. In 2022 at ISSF Junior World Cup held at Suhl, Germany he won the silver in 25 meter standard pistol open junior mixed team and later at 2022 ISSF World Shooting Championships he won two golds and a bronze.

References

External links
 Profile at ISSF

Living people
Indian male sport shooters
2002 births
21st-century Indian people